Delano Roger Williams (November 9, 1945 – November 30, 1984) was an American football offensive guard in the National Football League. He was drafted by the New Orleans Saints in the third round of the 1967 NFL Draft. He played college football at Florida State.

Williams is a member of Florida State's All-Time Team.

Williams died of amyotrophic lateral sclerosis (ALS or sometimes referred to as Lou Gehrig's disease).

References

External links

1945 births
1984 deaths
American football centers
American football offensive guards
Florida State Seminoles football players
New Orleans Saints players
People from Live Oak, Florida
Neurological disease deaths in Louisiana
Deaths from motor neuron disease
Ed Block Courage Award recipients